The Caithness Flagstone Group is a Devonian lithostratigraphic group (a sequence of rock strata) in northern Scotland. The name is derived from the traditional county of Caithness where the strata are well exposed, especially in coastal cliffs.

Outcrops 
These rocks are exposed, along the Moray Firth and along the eastern side of Sutherland and throughout Caithness, across Orkney and, to a rather lesser extent, in Shetland.

Lithology and stratigraphy 
The Group comprises the Upper Stromness Flagstone Formation and the Lower Stromness Flagstone Formation laid down in the lacustrine Orcadian Basin during the Eifelian Stage of the Devonian Period. 

It contains numerous rhythmic sequences of mudstone, limestone, siltstone and sandstone of which there are 25 and 38 in the constituent lower and upper formations respectively. A conglomerate occurs at the base of the lower formation. A notable element is the Sandwick Fish Bed which defines the junction of the two formations and from which a diverse range of fish fossils have been recovered.

References 

Geological groups of the United Kingdom
Geologic formations of Scotland
Devonian System of Europe
Eifelian Stage
Sandstone formations
Mudstone formations
Siltstone formations
Lacustrine deposits
Fossiliferous stratigraphic units of Europe
Paleontology in the United Kingdom